Rok Benkovič (born 20 March 1986) is a Slovenian former ski jumper who competed from 2001 to 2007.

Benkovič started with his sport career at the relatively advanced age of eleven, when he first participated in ski jumping in 1997. In Sollefteå, Sweden, he won the silver medal at the Junior World Championship on 6 February 2003. His biggest success came at the 2005 FIS Nordic World Ski Championships in Oberstdorf, where he won the individual normal hill on 19 February 2005, making him the second Slovenian to win a gold medal after that of Franci Petek in 1991. The very next day, he won a bronze medal for the Slovenians in a team normal hill competition involving Primož Peterka, Jure Bogataj and Jernej Damjan.

He also competed at the 2006 Winter Olympics in Turin, finishing 10th in the team large hill, 29th in the individual large hill, and 49th in the individual normal hill.

From 2005 to 2007, Benkovič held the Slovenian national distance record of 226 metres, set in Planica. This was broken by countryman Robert Kranjec, who jumped 229 m. In May 2007 Benkovič retired from ski jumping.

Career

Olympic Games

World Championships
2 medals (1 gold, 1 bronze)

Ski-Flying World Championships

World Cup

Standings

References

External links
 

1986 births
Living people
Slovenian male ski jumpers
Ski jumpers at the 2006 Winter Olympics
Olympic ski jumpers of Slovenia
FIS Nordic World Ski Championships medalists in ski jumping
Skiers from Ljubljana
21st-century Slovenian people